Brazil as the host nation of the 2021 Summer Deaflympics is currently competing in the event fielding 159 athletes. This was the 8th consecutive time that Brazil was eligible to participate at the Summer Deaflympics since making its debut in Sofia 1993.

Brazil is also having the largest number of delegates among the nations competing in the multi-sport event and this is also the largest ever delegation that Brazil has sent in a single edition of the Summer Deaflympics.

Football 

Brazil men's deaf national football team and Brazil women's deaf national football team are competing in the football competition as the host nation.

Basketball 

Brazil men's deaf national basketball team and Brazil women's deaf national basketball team are competing in the basketball tournament as the host nation.

Handball 

Brazil men's deaf national handball team and Brazil women's deaf national handball team are competing in the handball tournament as the host nation.

Table tennis 

Beatriz Araújo Amorim
Thiago Benedito Castro 
Maria Fernanda da Silva Costa

Karate 

 Isabella Vieira da Silva Bahia

Cycling 

 Kamilla Rodrigues Barbosa

Judo 

 Letícia Ribeiro Bauermann
 Rômulo da Silva Crispim
 Carolina Stefany Kich Da Silva
 Leonardo Francisco Dos Santos
 Alexandre Soares Fernandes

Athletics 

 Aline Bieger
 Aguinaldo Padilha Da Silva

Orienteering 

 Madeline Silva Silveira Boeck
 Linda Francieli Pucheta Da Silva

Volleyball

Badminton 

 Renata Faustino Da Silva
 Gabriel Hovelacque De Faria
 Geisa Vieira De Oliveira

Beach Volleyball 

 Lucas Jambeiro Dos Santos

References

External links 

 Brazil at the Deaflympics

2022 in Brazilian sport
Brazil at the Deaflympics
Nations at the 2021 Summer Deaflympics